Holy Trinity Cathedral, Oulu, is an Eastern Orthodox cathedral in Oulu, Finland. The church is located in the Hollihaka district about one kilometre south of the city centre.

The church building was designed by architect Mikko Huhtela and was completed in 1957. The church was consecrated in October 1958 and dedicated to the Holy Trinity. In 1980 the Oulu Diocese of the Orthodox Church of Finland was created and the church was consecrated as a cathedral.

See also 
 List of cathedrals in Finland
 Saint Nicholas Cathedral, Kuopio
 Uspenski Cathedral

References

External links
 

Churches completed in 1957
Churches in Oulu
Finnish Orthodox cathedrals
Hollihaka